These are the international rankings of Morocco

International rankings
 Institute for Economics and Peace - Global Peace Index ranked Morocco 63rd out of 144 countries.
 The 2002 Reporters Without Borders' worldwide press freedom index ranked Morocco 119th out of 167 countries.	
 The Economist's   ranked Morocco 65th out of 111 countries.

References

Morocco